Gene McLaurin was a Democratic member of the North Carolina Senate, representing the 25th district. McLaurin served on the Commerce, Agriculture/Environment/Natural Resources, Appropriations on Natural and Economic Resources, Finance, Insurance, Pensions & Retirement and Aging, and State and Local Government committees. Before being elected to the North Carolina Senate in 2012, McLaurin served as the mayor of Rockingham, North Carolina from 1997 to 2012. McLaurin considers himself to be moderate to conservative in his political views, counting Jim Hunt, Ronald Reagan, and Terry Sanford among his political heroes. In addition to his political career, McLaurin has also worked as the general manager of TOTAL Lubricants and the president of Swink-Quality Oil Company.

Electoral history

Mayor of Rockingham (2009):
  Gene McLaurin: 1,408
 Bruce Stanback: 364
       Write-In: 13

Mayor of Rockingham (2011):
  Gene McLaurin: 858
       Write-In: 13

NC State Senate District 25 (2012):
  Gene McLaurin (D): 44,560
  Gene McIntyre (R): 39,506

NC State Senate District 25 (2014):
    Tom McInnis (R): 28,496
  Gene McLaurin (D): 26,632
    P.H Dawkins (L): 1,412

Political future

Gene has openly stated he is open to running for political office again in 2016 after his 2014 defeat. This has led to speculations about what he may intend on running for. Many believe he should run for his old state senate or run for a state house seat. Others have urged the former state senator to run for higher office either for Congress or at the state level.

References

External links
Project Vote Smart biography
Senate page

Living people
People from Rockingham, North Carolina
Businesspeople from North Carolina
Mayors of places in North Carolina
Democratic Party North Carolina state senators
Year of birth missing (living people)